Comabbio is a comune (municipality) in the Province of Varese in the Italian region Lombardy, located about  northwest of Milan and about  southwest of Varese.

Comabbio borders the following municipalities: Mercallo, Osmate, Sesto Calende, Ternate, Travedona-Monate, Varano Borghi, Vergiate.

Demographic evolution

References

Cities and towns in Lombardy